Nicolás Gabriel Chávez (born 1 July 2001) is an Argentine professional footballer who plays as a midfielder for Chacarita Juniors.

Career
Chávez is a product of Chacarita Juniors' youth system. He, aged seventeen, made the breakthrough into senior football with them during the 2018–19 Primera B Nacional campaign under Patricio Pisano, who substituted the midfielder on during a home defeat to Sarmiento on 23 February 2019.

Career statistics
.

References

External links

2001 births
Living people
Place of birth missing (living people)
Argentine footballers
Association football midfielders
Primera Nacional players
Chacarita Juniors footballers